Novoselskoye (Kerla-Yurt) is a rural locality (a selo) and the administrative centre of Novoselsky Selsoviet, Khasavyurtovsky District, Republic of Dagestan, Russia. The population was 2,941 as of 2010. There are 24 streets.

Geography 
Novoselskoye is located 32 km north of Khasavyurt (the district's administrative centre) by road. Moksob is the nearest rural locality.

References 

Rural localities in Khasavyurtovsky District